TNA One Night Only (2013) is a series of professional wrestling One Night Only events held by Total Nonstop Action Wrestling (TNA) in 2013.

X-Travaganza

One Night Only: X-Travaganza honored and paid tribute to the X-Division as the past, present, and future X-Division stars collided. As part of his retirement tour, this was Jerry Lynn's final match in TNA. It took place on January 12, 2013, from the Impact Zone in Orlando, Florida and aired on PPV on April 5, 2013.

 Xscape eliminations

Joker's Wild

One Night Only: Joker's Wild was made up of tag team matches in which the partners were randomly drawn in a lottery and teams had to work together to advance to the main event battle royal, with the grand prize of US$100,000. It took place on January 12, 2013, from the Impact Zone in Orlando, Florida and aired on PPV on May 3, 2013.

 Gauntlet battle royal

Hardcore Justice 2

One Night Only: Hardcore Justice 2 consisted of matches with various hardcore wrestling stipulations, and took place on March 19, 2013, from the Impact Zone in Orlando, Florida and aired on PPV on July 5, 2013.

 Hardcore gauntlet battle royal

 Six-man elimination tag team match

10 Reunion

One Night Only: 10 Reunion included stars from the early years of TNA returning. TNA's greatest feuds and rivalries from the past, were reignited for one night only. It took place on March 17, 2013, from the Impact Zone in Orlando, Florida and aired on PPV on August 2, 2013.

 Gauntlet battle royal

Knockouts Knockdown

One Night Only: Knockouts Knockdown was a series of matches featuring various Knockouts and independent wrestlers. The winners of these matches would advance to a gauntlet battle royal, with the winner being crowned the "Queen of the Knockouts". It took place on March 17, 2013, from the Impact Zone in Orlando, Florida and aired on PPV on September 6, 2013.

 Gauntlet battle royal

Tournament of Champions

One Night Only: Tournament of Champions included the top World Champions in TNA history battling to determine the greatest of all time. It took place on March 19, 2013, from the Impact Zone in Orlando, Florida and aired on PPV on November 1, 2013.

 Tournament bracket

World Cup

One Night Only: World Cup was an event which took teams of wrestlers from around the World and had them compete in Heavyweight, X Division, Tag Team and Knockouts Division matches to crown the TNA World Cup Champions. It took place on March 18, 2013, from the Impact Zone in Orlando, Florida and aired on PPV on December 6, 2013.

Teams and members

 Team USA
  Christopher Daniels
  James Storm
  Kazarian
  Kenny King
  Mickie James

 Team UK
  Douglas Williams
  Magnus
  Rob Terry
  Rockstar Spud
  Hannah Blossom

 Team International
  Funaki
  Mesias
  Petey Williams
  Sonjay Dutt
  Lei'D Tapa

 Team Aces & Eights
 D.O.C.
 Knux
 Mr. Anderson
 Wes Brisco
 Ivelisse

 Points

 Ten-person elimination tag team match

References

2013 in professional wrestling
Professional wrestling in Orlando, Florida
Events in Orlando, Florida
2013 in professional wrestling in Florida
2013